Merapi may refer to:

 Mount Merapi, an active volcano in Central Java, Indonesia
 2010 eruptions of Mount Merapi
 Mount Marapi (also known as Mount Merapi), an active volcano in West Sumatra, Indonesia
 the stratovolcano Mount Merapi, part of the Ijen volcano complex in Eastern Java, Indonesia
 536 Merapi, an asteroid
 USS Merapi (AF-38) an Adria-class stores ship acquired in 1945 by the United States Navy for service in World War 2.